Lee Heung-soon is a retired female badminton player from South Korea.

Career
Lee competed in badminton at the 1992 Summer Olympics in women's singles. She lost in quarterfinals to Huang Hua, of China, 11-3, 10-12, 11-0.

Achievements

World Championships 
Women's singles

World Cup 
Women's singles

Asian Championships 
Women's singles

World Junior Championships 
The Bimantara World Junior Championships was an international invitation badminton tournament for junior players. It was held in Jakarta, Indonesia from 1987 to 1991.

Girls' doubles

IBF World Grand Prix 
The World Badminton Grand Prix sanctioned by International Badminton Federation (IBF) from 1983 to 2006.

Women's singles

Invitational Tournament 
Women's doubles

References 
 

South Korean female badminton players
Badminton players at the 1992 Summer Olympics
Olympic badminton players of South Korea
1971 births
Living people
Asian Games medalists in badminton
Badminton players at the 1994 Asian Games
Badminton players at the 1990 Asian Games
Asian Games gold medalists for South Korea
Asian Games bronze medalists for South Korea
Medalists at the 1990 Asian Games
Medalists at the 1994 Asian Games